Raver Lok Sabha constituency  is one of the 48 Lok Sabha (lower house of Indian parliament) constituencies of Maharashtra state in western India. This constituency was created on 19 February 2008 as a part of the implementation of the Presidential notification based on the recommendations of the Delimitation Commission of India constituted on 12 July 2002. It first held elections in 2009 and its first member of parliament (MP) was Haribhau Jawale of the Bharatiya Janata Party.

Vidhan Sabha segments
Presently, Raver Lok Sabha constituency comprises six Vidhan Sabha (legislative assembly) segments. These segments are:

Members of Lok Sabha

Election results

General Elections 2019

General Elections 2014

General election 2009

See also
 Erandol Lok Sabha constituency
 Jalgaon district
 Buldhana district
 List of Constituencies of the Lok Sabha

Notes

External links
Raver lok sabha  constituency election 2019 results details

Lok Sabha constituencies in Maharashtra
Lok Sabha constituencies in Maharashtra created in 2008
Jalgaon district
Buldhana district